Jafar Zafarani is an Iranian mathematician. A professor at the University of Isfahan and chancellor at Sheikhbahaee University, Zafarani's research interests include functional analysis and nonlinear functional analysis. Zafarani obtained his BSc in Mathematics at the University of Tehran in 1969 and completed his D.Sc. at the University of Liège, Belgium in 1974. He served as president of the Iranian Mathematical Society from 1989 to 1991.

Professional Experience 
Associate editor of the Journal  of  Sciences,  Islamic Republic of
Iran. 
Associate editor of the Journal of Optimization, Theory and Applications. 
Associate editor of the Journal of Nonlinear and Variational Analysis. 
President at Sheikhbahaee University

See also 
Science in Iran

References

External links
Jafar Zafarani's Homepage at UI 
Jafar Zafarani's Publications 
Jafar Zafarani on MathSciNet

20th-century Iranian mathematicians
21st-century Iranian mathematicians
Academic staff of the University of Isfahan
University of Tehran alumni
University of Liège alumni
1947 births
Living people
Iran's Book of the Year Awards recipients